Endor or Ein Dor may refer to:

Places
 Endor (village), from the Hebrew Bible, a Canaanite village where the Witch of Endor lived
 Indur, a Palestinian village depopulated during the 1948 Arab-Israeli war
 Ein Dor, a Kibbutz in modern Israel

Fictional locations
 Endor (Star Wars), the fictional forest moon which is home to the Ewoks, or the gas giant the moon orbits, of the same name
 Middle-earth, in J. R. R. Tolkien's fictional world of Arda, where Endor is the Quenya name for it
 Endor, the most successful nation in the video game Dragon Quest IV

Other uses
 ENDOR, electron nuclear double resonance, a variation of electron spin resonance
 Endor, a DJ who remixed Danzel's hit "Pump It Up!" in 2019

See also 

 Witch of Endor
 Endora (disambiguation)
 Ender (disambiguation)